MGM Cotai is a casino resort in Cotai, Macau. Opened on 13 February 2018, it is MGM Resorts International's second property in Macau, after the MGM Macau.

The hotel consists of 1,390 rooms and suites, a 2000-seat MGM Theater, a casino, meeting spaces, and a retail promenade. It also features the world's largest art garden, Nature's Art, which houses over 100,000 plants and more than 2,000 plant species, including several previously extinct species.

The hotel was featured in Series 3 on the BBC television series Amazing Hotels: Life Beyond the Lobby.

Design and construction
Designed by Kohn Pedersen Fox Associates, it was constructed at a cost of $3.4 billion. The unique structure has the appearance of nine jewel-like boxes stacked upon each other, forming two interconnected towers. Its exterior is coloured gold, silver, and bronze similar to the MGM Macau. In 2018, the hotel won the Emporis Skyscraper Award. MGM Cotai, with a total floor area of 280,000 sqm, has 1,390 rooms and suites including 16 skylofts and 27 mansion villas. The hotel's atrium connecting the main lobby to shops and restaurants, named The Spectacle, features the world's largest free-span gridshell glazed roof that is self-supporting. 125 gaming tables have been allocated to the property's casino, of which 100 were allocated at launch and the remaining 25 to be allocated in 2019. A further 77 tables transferred from MGM Macau have been authorised by the government, bringing the total to 177 gaming tables.

Opening
Initially scheduled in 2016, the opening of MGM Cotai was delayed several times before finally opening on 13 February 2018, just ahead of Chinese New Year. However, on opening day, the hotel's VIP accommodations, including The Mansions, was not completed. In addition, out of 1,390 rooms, only 500 rooms were available at the opening. The hotel was subsequently completed and fully operational within the same year.

Future developments
First mentioned in 2018, an additional south hotel tower housing approximately 1,000 rooms has been planned as part of MGM Cotai's expansion. An expansion of the existing retail podium is also included as part of the plan to allow for more restaurants, retail outlets, and entertainment spots. Foundations for the expansion have been pre-built when constructing the resort.

Details of the expansion have not been revealed as of date. However, it was announced that the expansion will not be likely before 2021.

References

External links

 MGM Cotai website

2018 establishments in Macau
Casinos completed in 2018
Hotel buildings completed in 2018
Casinos in Macau
Resorts in Macau
Hotels in Macau
Macau Peninsula
Cotai
Kohn Pedersen Fox buildings